German submarine U-78 was a Type VIIC submarine of Nazi Germany's Kriegsmarine during World War II. She was the only German submarine to be sunk by land-based artillery fire during the war. Built by Bremen-Vegesack.

She was ordered on 25 January 1939, and laid down on 28 March 1940, in the shipyard of Bremer Vulkan in the port city of Bremen-Vegesack as yard number 6. U-78 was launched on 7 December 1940 and formally commissioned  into the Kriegsmarine as a "school boat" on 15 February 1941, with a crew of 41 under the command of Kapitänleutnant Alfred Dumrese.

Design
German Type VIIC submarines were preceded by the shorter Type VIIB submarines. U-78 had a displacement of  when at the surface and  while submerged. She had two shafts and two  propellers.

U-78 was fitted with two  torpedo tubes at the bow, fourteen torpedoes, one  SK C/35 naval gun, 220 rounds, and a  C/30 anti-aircraft gun. The boat had a complement of between forty-four and sixty.

Service history
U-78 spent the majority of her career as a training U-boat, during which time she had several different crews. As a result, she never sank any enemy vessels nor engaged any enemy ships or convoys. On 1 March 1945, she was transferred to the 4th U-boat Flotilla but never saw any combat; prior to beginning her first patrol she was sunk on 16 April 1945. U-78's fate is notable in that she was the only German U-boat to be sunk by land-based artillery fire during World War II.

Use as a training boat
U-78 spent almost her entire career as part of the 22nd U-boat Flotilla as a "school boat", a role which saw her being used to train U-boat crews. During this time, her commander was changed six times: in July 1941 from Kapitänleutnant (Kptlt.) Alfred Dumrese to Oberleutnant zur See (O/L) Kurt Makowski, who remained in command until February 1942 when she was handed over to Kptlt. Max Bernd Dieterich; in July 1942, Kptlt. Ernst Ziehm took command of the U-boat from Dieterich in November 1942. Kptlt. Helmut Sommer took command from Ziehm in May 1943; the sixth commander of U-78 took control of the U-boat when Wilhelm Eisele was named captain and lastly, the seventh commander, O/L Horst Hübsch, took command of U-78 from Eisele on 27 November 1944. All of U-78s changes of command took place while the U-boat was still serving as a training boat. Crewmembers used her as a practice submarine before being assigned to their operational U-boat.

Sinking
By March 1945, the war was coming to an end, the Kriegsmarine was faced with a dwindling number of active U-boats. To offset this, the Navy looked to transfer boats away from other duties, such as training. On 1 March 1945, U-78 began active service with the 4th U-boat Flotilla. Just a month and a half later, however, on 16 April 1945, U-78 was sunk after being attacked by Soviet land-based artillery while she was docked near the electricity supply pier in the German port of Pillau in East Prussia.

References

Bibliography

External links

German Type VIIC submarines
U-boats commissioned in 1941
U-boats sunk in 1945
World War II submarines of Germany
Ships built in Bremen (state)
1940 ships
Maritime incidents in April 1945